Malai Mahadeshwara Wildlife Sanctuary or Male Mahadeshwara Wildlife Sanctuary  is a protected Wildlife sanctuary in the Western Ghats and is located in the state of Karnataka in India. It is named after the presiding deity "Lord Male Mahadeshwara" of the famed Male Mahadeshwara Hills Temple located within the sanctuary. The sanctuary lies in the Chamarajanagar district of Karnataka.

The sanctuary is part of a contiguous tiger habitat, located very close to the tri-junction of the states of Karnataka, Kerala and Tamil Nadu. The sanctuary has Cauvery Wildlife Sanctuary (Karnataka) to its North and East, Sathyamangalam Tiger Reserve (Tamil Nadu) to its South and Biligirirangaswamy Temple Tiger Reserve (Karnataka) to its West.

Flora
The predominant forest type of the sanctuary is dry and moist deciduous forests. As per research reports published, Lantana has invaded substantial areas around Malai Mahadeshwara Hills.

Fauna
Indian Elephant (Elephas maximus) is found in good numbers within the sanctuary. After the creation of the sanctuary in 2013, the tiger (Panthera tigris tigris) population has been steadily increasing. Based on the research by the forest department and scientists to monitor the population of tiger (Panthera tigris)  and leopards and increased tiger sightings, environmentalists have highlighted the need to ensure better protection to tigers, by declaring the sanctuary along with Cauvery Wildlife Sanctuary as a tiger reserve.

Kollegal ground gecko (Cyrtodactylus collegalensis) was discovered in this region in 2013.

The sanctuary also has other fauna like gaur (Bos gaurus), wild boar (Sus scrofa),  leopard (Panthera pardus), dhole, spotted deer (Axis axis), barking deer (Muntiacus muntjak), sambar (Cervus unicolor), four-horned antelope (Tetracerus quadricornis), black-naped hare (Lepus nigricollis), chevrotain, common langur, bonnet macaque, honey badger (ratel) etc.,

References

Tourist attractions in Chamarajanagar district
Wildlife sanctuaries in Karnataka
2013 establishments in Karnataka
Protected areas established in 2013